The Vesdre (French) or Weser (German) and Vesder (Dutch) is a river in Liège Province, eastern Belgium. A few kilometres of the upper reaches also flow through the German municipality Roetgen and form part of the Belgian–German border. It is a right tributary to the river Ourthe. Its source lies in the High Fens, close to the border with Germany near Monschau. It flows through an artificial lake (Lake Eupen), and then through the towns of Eupen, Verviers, Pepinster and Chaudfontaine. The Vesdre flows into the Ourthe a few kilometres from Liège where the Ourthe in turn flows into the river Meuse.

The water of the Vesdre has a high acidity (due to the Hautes Fagnes bogs), which made it very suitable for the textiles industry around Verviers. The Vesdre was the far eastern end of the sillon industriel, the backbone of Walloon industry. Nowadays, the water of the Vesdre is mainly used as drinking water.

References

Rivers of the Ardennes (Belgium)
Rivers of Belgium
Rivers of Wallonia
Rivers of Liège Province
Limbourg
Pepinster
Rivers of the Eifel
Rivers of North Rhine-Westphalia
Rivers of Germany
Belgium–Germany border
International rivers of Europe
Border rivers